The 1962 Miami Hurricanes football team represented the University of Miami as an independent during the 1962 NCAA University Division football season. Led by 15th-year head coach Andy Gustafson, the Hurricanes played their home games at the Miami Orange Bowl in Miami, Florida. Miami finished the season 7–4. The team's offense scored 189 points while the defense allowed 217 points. The Hurricanes competed in the final Gotham Bowl, held at Yankee Stadium. Just 6,166 people came to the game, in which the Nebraska defeated Miami, 36–34. It was the only college bowl game ever played at the stadium.

Schedule

Roster
QB #10 George Mira, Jr.

Team players drafted into the NFL

References

Miami
Miami Hurricanes football seasons
Miami Hurricanes football